The Philippine House Committee on Tourism, or House Tourism Committee is a standing committee of the Philippine House of Representatives.

Jurisdiction 
As prescribed by House Rules, the committee's jurisdiction is on the promotion and development of tourism both domestic and international.

Members, 18th Congress

Historical members

18th Congress

Member for the Majority 
 Bernardita Ramos (Sorsogon–2nd, NPC)

See also 
 House of Representatives of the Philippines
 List of Philippine House of Representatives committees
 Department of Tourism

Notes

References

External links 
House of Representatives of the Philippines

Tourism
Tourism in the Philippines